Trachygonidae is a family of millipedes belonging to the order Chordeumatida. Adult millipedes in this family have 28 or 30 segments (counting the collum as the first segment and the telson as the last).

Genera:
 Acrochordum Attems, 1899
 Gottscheeosoma Verhoeff, 1927
 Halleinosoma Verhoeff, 1913
 Heteracrochordum Loksa, 1960
 Trachygona Cook, 1895
 Trachysoma

References

Chordeumatida